Boyton Cross is a hamlet in Essex, England. It is approximately half a mile from the village of Roxwell and is situated mainly along the A1060 road which runs from Bishop's Stortford to Chelmsford.  There is a pub (The Hare, which was refurbished in 2010).  Commercial premises include a variety of farms & privately hired industrial units.

Hamlets in Essex